Alicja is a Polish language given name that is equivalent to Alice in English. Notable people with the name include:

Alicja Bachleda-Curuś (born 1983), Polish actress and singer
Alicja Boratyn (born 1992), Polish singer
Alicja Dorabialska (1897–1975), Polish chemist
Alicja Fiodorow, Paralympian athlete from Poland competing mainly in category T46 sprint events
Alicja Janosz (born 1985), the winner of Polish Idol in 2002
Alicja Kotowska (died 1939), Polish nun, head of the Resurrectionist convent in Wejherowo 1934 to 1939, martyred by the German Nazis in 1939
Alicja Majewska (born 1948), Polish singer
Alicja Olechowska (born 1956), Polish politician
Alicja Pęczak (born 1970), retired breaststroke and medley swimmer from Poland
Alicja Rosolska, Polish professional tennis player
Alicja Sakaguchi (born 1954), Polish linguist and university professor in the field of Esperanto and interlinguistics
Alicja Szemplińska (born 2002), also known mononymously as Alicja, Polish singer, entrant for 2020 Eurovision Song Contest
Alicja Trout, Memphis-based American rock guitarist, singer, songwriter and artist

See also
Prokurator Alicja Horn, 1933 Polish film directed by Marta Flanz and Michał Waszyński
 Alicja (film), a 1982 Polish-British co-production